Zelleria euthysema is a moth of the family Yponomeutidae. It is found in Australia.

External links
Australian Faunal Directory

Yponomeutidae
Moths described in 1923